The Haridwar Municipal Corporation is the civic body that governs the city of Haridwar in Uttarakhand, India.

Structure 
This corporation consists of 60 wards and is headed by a mayor who presides over a deputy mayor and 59 other corporators representing the wards. The mayor is elected directly through a first-past-the-post voting system and the deputy mayor is elected by the corporators from among their numbers.

List of mayors of the Haridwar Municipal Corporation

See also
 2013 Haridwar Municipal Corporation election

References

Haridwar
Municipal corporations in Uttarakhand
Year of establishment missing